Club Deportivo CREF is a women's basketball team based in Madrid that currently plays in the Spanish Liga Femenina de Baloncesto.

History

1960–1980: CREFF
Colegios Reunidos de Educación Física Femenina de Madrid was founded in 1960 by the Sección Femenina of the Movimiento Nacional, during the Francoism.

Its women's basketball team dominated the early stages of the Spanish League, winning seven titles between 1964 and 1971, and representing Spain in the FIBA European Cup with few success. Back then the team was considered the Real Madrid of women's basketball, and it shared arena with Real Madrid's male basketball team. Raimundo Saporta tried to convince Santiago Bernabéu to turn CREFF into the women's basketball section of Real Madrid, but failed in his attempt.

After the Movimiento Nacional was disbanded in 1977 the team couldn't find a sponsor and disappeared three years later.

1990–present: re-foundation
In 1990 it was refounded as Deportivo CREF, also known as CREF ¡Hola! by sponsorship reasons. The club had also a men's basketball section that played in Liga EBA, but its senior team was disbanded in 2007.

On 26 April 2015, the club achieved the promotion to the top tier after beating Fundal Alcobendas by 77–68 in the final game of the promotion playoffs.

CREF remained two seasons in the top league before being relegated to Liga Femenina 2. However, due to the lack of support and sponsorships, the club decided to dissolve the senior team and to continue playing only in youth competitions.

Season by season

Titles
 LFB (7)
 1964, 1965, 1967, 1968, 1969, 1970, 1971 
 Copa de la Reina (4)
 1962, 1963, 1972, 1974

Current roster

References

External links
  
 Profile at FEB.es

Sports teams in Madrid
Basketball teams established in 1960
Women's basketball teams in Spain
Basketball teams in the Community of Madrid